Yendountien Tiebekabe (born 18 January 1991) is a Togolese sprinter. He competed in the 100 metres event at the 2015 World Championships in Athletics in Beijing, China. In 2019, he competed in the men's 100 metres event at the 2019 World Athletics Championships in Doha, Qatar. He competed in the preliminary round and he did not advance to compete in the heats.

References

External links
 

1991 births
Living people
Togolese male sprinters
World Athletics Championships athletes for Togo
Place of birth missing (living people)
21st-century Togolese people